Sukhwinder Panchhi (or Sukhwinder Singh) is a Punjabi Singer-songwriter.

Discography

References

1968 births
Living people